Talib Shaghati Mishari Kinani, is an Iraqi General and who served as the commander of the Iraqi Special Operations Forces. Shaghati is known for leading the ISOF unit in the 2013-2017 War in Iraq as well as participating in the Iran-Iraq War. He graduated from the Military College Course (49) in 1970, graduated from the College Leadership Course (7), graduated from the Staff College Course (50).
After graduating from the military college he worked in the field artillery category and then participated in the basic missile course in 1971 in the Soviet Union and became a class of air defense / missiles.
He worked in the air defense units and in the series of positions until he reached the commander of the air defense brigade, then the dean of the air defense institute and finally the dean of the air defense college and the rank of air defense brigade in 2001.
Participated in the course of the leaders of fire brigades air defense in the Arab Republic of Egypt in 1983 and completed all courses of the basic category specialist.

After 2003 
After 2003 he served in the "National Security Council" as a military advisor. In 2005, my order was issued by appointing a military adviser to the Iraqi Prime Minister.
In 2007, he was appointed head of the anti-terrorism agency.
The anti-terrorism apparatus was formed in 2007 and is linked to the commander-in-chief of the armed forces.
In 2014 he was assigned the task of Joint Operations Commander in addition to the task of head of the anti-terrorist apparatus.

War against terrorism 
As commander of ISOF, Shaghati led the counter-terrorism force and played a key role in retaking cities back that were previously controlled by Islamic state during the War in Iraq 2013-2017.

Battles/wars in which he participated 
 Yom Kippur War
 Iran–Iraq War
 Gulf War
 Operation Ashura
 Siege of Amirli
 Battle of Baiji (2014–15)
 Second Battle of Tikrit
 Battle of Ramadi (2015–16)
 Battle of Fallujah (2016)
 Battle of Mosul (2016–2017)

References

External links
 Official Website of Iraqi Special Operations Forces

Military leaders of the Gulf War
Living people
Iraqi Shia Muslims
Iraqi generals
1956 births